Hilderic is a masculine Germanic given name that may refer to:

Hilderic, penultimate king of the Vandals and Alans (523–33)
Hilderic of Nîmes, a Visigothic count (fl. 672)
Hilderic of Farfa, abbot (842–57)

See also
Childeric (disambiguation), various uses of an earlier Frankish spelling of this name